Lisa Nicole Carson is an American actress. She is best known for her roles as Carla in ER (1996–2001), and Renee Raddick in Ally McBeal (1997–2002). Carson has also starred in films, most notably as Marti in Jason's Lyric (1994), Coretta in Devil in a Blue Dress (1995), Josie in Love Jones (1997), and Sylvia in Life (1999).

Following her struggles with bipolar disorder, for which she was hospitalized while starring in Ally McBeal, Carson went on hiatus until 2012, when she reprised her role as Renee Raddick in the final episode of Harry's Law. Most recently, Carson starred as Mae Bell in the miniseries The New Edition Story (2017).

Early life
Carson was born in Brooklyn, New York; her father is a journalism professor at the University of Florida, and her mother was a kindergarten teacher in New York. She spent her adolescence in Gainesville, Florida and attended F. W. Buchholz High School. Her parents separated when she was 14, and her mother moved back to New York alone. In 1986, she entered the Regional competition sponsored by the "America's Junior Miss" talent show, taking second place for the region held in Gainesville. After graduating in 1987, Carson returned to New York and decided that she wanted to be an actress. She began her career by appearing in a number of After School Specials and HBO short films.

Career
Carson appeared in productions at the famed Negro Ensemble Company. Her first notable credit came in 1991, when she appeared in Law & Order and in 1992 she had a non-speaking, minor role in the comedy series, The Cosby Show. She was a regular on The Apollo Comedy Hour before appearing in film in Let's Get Bizzee (1993), Jason's Lyric (1994) and Devil in a Blue Dress (1995). She has appeared in Love Jones and Life. She also performed as an R&B singer in the 1995 television movie Divas. She had a role in the 1997 movie Eve's Bayou, as Mattie Mereaux.

On television, she played the recurring character Carla Reece, the on/off girlfriend of Eriq La Salle's Dr Peter Benton in NBC's ER between 1996 and 2001. Between 1997 and 2002 she played prosecutor Renee Raddick in Fox's Ally McBeal, a role for which she received multiple award nominations. Carson was fired from both roles, amid reports about her erratic behavior on and off set, alleged drug use, being arrested and admissions to a mental health facility. She did return to Ally McBeal to reprise her role for the final episode.

After a ten year hiatus, she returned to acting in 2012, featuring in a guest appearance in the second-season finale of the NBC series Harry's Law reprising her character Renee Raddick from Ally McBeal. In 2017, she starred in the BET miniseries The New Edition Story.

Personal life
In 2000, she was arrested and then committed to a psychiatric hospital, after having a mental breakdown at a hotel in Manhattan.

In the July 2015 issue of Essence, Carson gave an interview in which she openly described her struggles with bipolar disorder and how the illness has affected her life and career. After having taken a 10-year hiatus from show business to live and receive treatment in New York, she reported having moved back to Los Angeles with plans to revitalize her acting career.

Filmography

Film

Television

References

External links
 

Living people
Actresses from New York City
American film actresses
Buchholz High School alumni
People from Brooklyn
Actresses from Gainesville, Florida
African-American actresses
American television actresses
20th-century American actresses
21st-century American actresses
People with bipolar disorder
20th-century African-American women
20th-century African-American people
21st-century African-American women
21st-century African-American people
Year of birth missing (living people)